Poinsett most often refers to Joel Roberts Poinsett (1779-1851), American physician and diplomat, namegiver for many of the other meanings.

Poinsett may also refer to:

Places

In the United States

Arkansas
Poinsett County, Arkansas, named for Joel Roberts Poinsett 
East Poinsett County School District 
East Poinsett County High School 
Lake Poinsett State Park
Poinsett Community Club
Poinsett County Courthouse
Poinsett Lumber and Manufacturing Company Manager's House

Delaware
Poinsett House, a home in Kenton, Delaware, that is listed in the National Register of Historic Places

Florida
Lake Poinsett (Florida)

South Carolina
Poinsett Bridge, a bridge near Columbia, South Carolina, and the oldest bridge in South Carolina
Poinsett Hotel, a hotel in Greenville, South Carolina, named for Joel Roberts Poinsett 
Poinsett State Park, a state park located in Sumter County, South Carolina, named for Joel Roberts Poinsett

South Dakota
Lake Poinsett (South Dakota), named for Joel Roberts Poinsett
Lake Poinsett (CDP), South Dakota

Outside the United States
Cape Poinsett, the northern extremity of Budd Coast, Antarctica, named for Joel Roberts Poinsett

Ships
, a sidewheel gunboat, named for Joel Roberts Poinsett
, launched 22 May 1944, named for Poinsett County, Arkansas

Other
Poinsettia, a plant species native to Mexico, also known as Christmas Flower, named for Joel Roberts Poinsett